Bitter & Twisted is the second studio album by the Australian Ska band Area-7. It was released in 2000 by Trademark Records.

Track listing
"Bitter Words"
"Start Making Sense"  
"Himbo"  
"Blind"  
"Walk Away"  
"Boys Don't Cry"  
"Skin Deep"  
"Dodgy Mate"  
"Let Me Down"  
"Unsung Hero"  
"Second Class Citizen"
"Big Ben"

Charts

Note
Track 6 is a cover of the song Boys Don't Cry by The Cure.

References

2000 debut albums
Area-7 albums